Diego Romero (born 1964) is a Cochiti Pueblo  artist living in New Mexico.

Background
Diego Romero was born in Berkeley, California in 1964. His father is Santiago Romero, a Cochiti Pueblo Indian, and his mother is Nellie Guth, a European-American born and raised in Berkeley. Diego was also raised in Berkeley, California, but spent his childhood summers with his paternal grandparents at the pueblo in Cochiti, New Mexico. Romero's father was a traditional painter, although he had lost a hand from being wounded in the Korean War. In his youth, Diego Romero related to his tribe with difficulty. But, the Cochiti council honored him by granting him the right to occupy his grandfather's property. His brother Mateo Romero is also a notable painter. Romero's wife, Cara Romero, is a noted photographer.

Art career
Raised in Berkeley, California, Diego Romero is a third-generation Cochiti Pueblo artist who specializes in pottery (he also does printmaking).  One of his collaborators in pottery was Navajo - Hopi ceramicist Nathan Begaye (1958 - 2010).

After art school in California, Romero attended the Institute of American Indian Arts (IAIA) in Santa Fe.  After one year at IAIA, he enrolled at Otis Parsons School of Design in Los Angeles, where he earned his BFA degree. He studied next at University of California, Los Angeles, where he received his MFA in 1993.

Romero's pots marry Cochiti Pueblo ceramics with his love of comic books, superheroes, mythology, and pop culture. He honors his Cochiti worldview and his ancestors' method of coiling clay but expands the tradition with imagery and painting treatments. He is a self-proclaimed "chronologist on the absurdity of human nature." He draws on prehistoric Ancestral Pueblo and Mimbres ceramics, Greek vessels, and pop culture. Romero's narratives combine humor and often-biting social commentary that communicate messages about contemporary Native American life, including difficult issues related to Native politics, history, identity, war, and alcoholism.

In the 1990s, Romero catapulted to notoriety in the American Southwest ceramics world with his "Chongo Brothers" polychromed earthenware series. A chongo is a Southwest Native man who wears his hair in a traditional bun. Some of the characters figured in his work reflect a Greek painting style, and portray idealized, muscular bodies. Romero's work explores gender politics, sexuality, and multifaceted identities of Native people, and all the while, relates the contemporary to the ancient.

A collection of his work toured Europe in 2006. He is represented by galleries in New York and Santa Fe, including Robert Nichols Gallery.

Notable collections
 British Museum, London, England, UK
 Cartier Foundation, Paris, France
 Heard Museum, Phoenix, AZ
 Metropolitan Museum of Art, New York, NY: Dough Bowl, 1994, gift of Ralph T. Coe
 Muscarelle Museum of Art, Williamsburg, VA
 National Museum of the American Indian, Washington, DC: She-Wana's Dream, 2008
 National Museum of Scotland, Edinburgh, Scotland, UK
 New Mexico Museum of Art, Santa Fe, NM
 Peabody Essex Museum, Salem, MA
 Haffenreffer Museum of Anthropology at Brown University, Providence, RI

See also
List of Native American artists

References

External links
Interview with Diego Romero by Larry Abbott
Images of his work at Robert Nichols Gallery
Vision Project, Diego Romero, Vision Project, by Dylan A. T. Miner

Living people
1964 births
Native American potters
Artists from New Mexico
Pueblo artists
20th-century Native Americans
21st-century Native Americans